Allenby C. Chilton (16 September 1918 – 15 June 1996) was an English footballer.

Playing career
Chilton started his career with Seaham Colliery before joining Liverpool as an amateur in the summer of 1938, but he never played a senior game for the Anfield club.

Chilton transferred to Manchester United soon after in November 1938 and made his first team debut against Charlton Athletic in September 1939. Chilton's early career was cut short by the Second World War although he made guest appearances for Airdrieonians, Cardiff City, Hartlepools United, Middlesbrough, Newcastle United and Charlton Athletic who he helped to win the War Cup South Final in 1944. He served in the Durham Light Infantry and saw active service in the Normandy Landings also in 1944.

Chilton established himself as a centre half in Matt Busby's first post-war team and helped United to triumph in the 1947–48 FA Cup and was a key member of the 1951–52 league championship winning team. He was made club captain during the 1953–54 season. Having missed just 13 games in nine seasons at United and with 175 consecutive appearances to his name, Chilton requested a rest from first team action in early 1955. He was replaced by Mark Jones, one of the rising Busby Babes, and never returned to first team action.

Management career

Grimsby Town
He left the club in March 1955 to become player-manager with Grimsby Town. He joined the Mariners late in the 1954–55 season and was unable to stop them having to apply for re-election, but the following season under his management they were champions of Division Three North – the only club ever to go from re-election to promotion in one season.

Wigan Athletic
Chilton continued as manager at Grimsby Town until April 1959 when he joined Wigan Athletic as manager for one season during 1960–61.

Hartlepools United
Chilton joined Hartlepools United as a scout for the 1961–62 season and became manager during 1962–63.

References

1918 births
1996 deaths
English footballers
Liverpool F.C. players
Manchester United F.C. players
Hartlepool United F.C. wartime guest players
Middlesbrough F.C. wartime guest players
Newcastle United F.C. wartime guest players
Charlton Athletic F.C. wartime guest players
Grimsby Town F.C. players
English football managers
England international footballers
Grimsby Town F.C. managers
Wigan Athletic F.C. managers
Hartlepool United F.C. managers
1954 FIFA World Cup players
English Football League players
Footballers from Sunderland
Durham Light Infantry soldiers
British Army personnel of World War II
Airdrieonians F.C. (1878) wartime guest players
Cardiff City F.C. wartime guest players
Association football central defenders
FA Cup Final players